Depressaria rjabovi is a moth in the family Depressariidae. It was described by Alexandr L. Lvovsky in 1990. It is found in Turkmenistan.

References

Moths described in 1990
Depressaria
Moths of Asia